Korangi Fish Harbour is located in Chashma Goth, Deh Rehri, Korangi District, Karachi, Sindh, Pakistan. It is managed by Federal Ministry of Maritime Affairs, Government of Pakistan. The purpose for establishment of KoFHA was to exploit deep sea resources beyond provincial territorial water i.e. beyond 20 nautical miles.

See also 
 List of fish harbours of Pakistan
 Karachi Fisheries Harbour Authority

External links
 Sindh Coastal and Inland Community Development Project
 A brief on Fisheries in Pakistan

Ports in Karachi
Economy of Karachi
Fish harbours of Pakistan
Ministry of Maritime Affairs (Pakistan)